Vishnu Raj Atreya (10 November 1944 – July 18, 2020) was a Nepali writer and poet, who wrote in Nepali language, Sanskrit language and Awadhi language. He used the title Latosaathi (meaning: mute friend) in his poetry works since 1963 A.D. He is considered to be the first person to start writing Haiku in Sanskrit language.

Life

Early life
Atreya was born on 10 November 1944 as the first son of Dev Raj Upadhayaya and Sharada Devi in Rashminilaya, Kapilvastu, Nepal. His father Dev Raj and grandfather Rashmi Raj both were Sanskrit scholars. He was intelligent since his childhood. He attained his basic education under the custodianship of his father (who was a teacher in Tauleshwor Sanskrit Pathshala) and his grandfather Rashmi Raj. He started his education from Harihar Sanskrit Vidhyapeeth, Khidim (now affiliated to Nepal Sanskrit University). He then went to India for further education, where he completed undergraduate in Sankhya-Yog-Puran-History from Banaras Hindu University, Varanasi. He finished his master's degree in Navya Vyakarana from Sampurnanand Sanskrit Vishwavidyalaya, Varanasi. He further completed master's degree in Nepali and Political Science from Tribhuvan University, Nepal. He then completed his PhD in Navya Vyakarana from Sampurnanand Sanskrit Vishwavidyalaya, Varanasi, India.  He was visiting professor at Banaras Hindu University, Varanasi, Sampurnanand Sanskrit Vishwavidyalaya, Varanasi, India and professor at Nepal Sanskrit University, Valmiki Vidyapeeth, Kathmandu, Nepal. He retired after 47 years of teaching.

Family
He was married to Guneshwori Acharya (Arya Atreya after marriage) in July 1974.

Health
In early 2019, Atreya suffered from Gallbladder cancer. He was admitted to the Rajiv Gandhi Cancer Institute and Research Centre, India, for four months. He has been undergoing treatment at Patan Hospital, Lalitpur. After he was diagnosed with this condition, he started writing a novel titled 'वररुची कात्यायन' (Vararuchi Katyayan) which is in press for publication.

Death
Atreya died on July 18, 2020, at the age of 75, due to gallbladder cancer.

Latosaathi title

Although his name is Vishnu Raj Atreya, he introduced himself as 'Latosaathi' since 1963 A.D. He believed that literature itself is mute and a person adds life and sense to it. This might be the reason that he added 'Latosaathi' as his literary title. He has expressed this view in his first short-epic 'कपिलवस्तु' (Kapilvastu) as:

"लिपि छ मूक लेखेनी मूक लेखक पनि स्वयं म मूकै छु।"

The script is silent, the writing is silent and me being the main writer am also silent. 

Poet of the nation, Madhav Prasad Ghimire writes his view on Atreya's Latosathi title as: "I think Atreya was influenced from द्वा सुपर्णा सयुजा सखाया (dwa suparna sayuja sakhaya) from Rigveda. The metaphore of that bird of Rigveda is life that undergoes karma and god who looks after as a witness. As such, Latosathi is that clever friend who looks after his friends as a witness. If I would ask him about this, he would not speak but write sarcasm on deformed society and social Distortion and simply keep on laughing."

Works

Social works
Atreya has been involved in various social works throughout his life. After starting his studies in Varanasi, he became a member of Nepal Student Organisation (1957 A.D.). In the year 1966 A.D. he then became Literature and Culture Minister of same organisation. He was editor of 'छात्रदूत' published by Nepal Sanskrit Student Council. Similarly, he was founding member of Baneras Sahitya Samparka Samiti in 1968 A.D. and organised various cultural and religious programmes to encourage Nepali students studying abroad.

He also became vice president of Kapilvastu Samaj, secretary of Panini Award Committee (1991 A.D.), member of Noorganga Pratibha Puraskar Guthi (1992 A.D.), executive member of Dadhiram Marasani Smriti Pratisthan (1994 A.D.), member of Nepal Pragya Pratisthan, vice-chairman of Gaukalyan Sangh, advisor of Kapilvastu Samaj, convenor of Rupak Smriti Pratisthan, member of Madan Puraskar Guthi etc. He had also played important role in erecting statue of Bhawani Bhikshu in Kapilvastu, Nepal.

Religious works
Atreya was born in religious family background which made him very active in religious activities. He started his early education following Gurukul tradition since his childhood. While he was student in Harihar Sanskrit Vidhyapeeth itself, he started writing poem by worshipping stone as:

"पाषाण मान्दछु तँलाई म देव रूप"

Stone, I consider you to be the form of God.

He had recited Devi-Bhagavata Purana and Bhagavata Purana while he was studying in Varanasi, India which shows his religious inclination. His daily life was influenced by Eastern philosophy therefore he performed jap, tap meditation, yoga daily  until he became physically weak (July 2020). He was a national member of Vishwa Hindu Mahasangh and travelled around Nepal and abroad to attend and present papers in Hindu conferences.

Educational works
He has served as a professor of Navya Vyakaran in Nepal Sanskrit University for seventeen years (1996-2013). Before joining Nepal Sanskrit University he worked as a reader in Tribhuvan University (1988-1996), visiting professor in Sampurnanand Sanskrit University, Banaras Hindu University (1980-1988) and lecturer and reader in Tribhuvan University (1970-1980). Since 2004, he has been member of Pragya Sabha, and contributing to scholar areas. He was a producer and director of a Sanskrit Learning Program "Samskritam" in Nepal Television for six months in 1989.

Acting in plays and cinemas
Since his hostel life itself, Atreya used to write, direct and act in plays. While he was studying in Varanasi, he used to visit his home town Kapilvastu during summer vacation and attend and participate in cultural programs. Once he wrote, directed and acted in a play which plots saving a royal swan of Siddhartha Gautam on a yearly program at Yashodhara Lower Secondary School, Taulihawa, Nepal.

Atreya has also played in various Nepali movies. He started his movie appearance as a role of professor in a black and white movie titled 'मनको बाँध' (Manko baandh), which is a first film produced by Royal Nepal Film Corporation, directed by Prakash Thapa. He also acted as a friend of the main actor in the movie 'सिन्दुर' (Sindur). In the year 1999, he also acted as Gajadhar Soti in a historical movie titled Bhanubhakta Acharya directed by Yadav Kharel. He has also directed and led Sanskrit plays in Kalidash Janmajayanti program organised in Ujjain, India.

As lyricist
Atreya has also contributed to the Nepali Music Industry. His compositions "कोटी कोटी नेपालीको एउतै भावना छ" (Millions of Nepalis have same feelings), "लाख वर्ष बाँच तिमी, शुभकामना" (Be alive for 1 million years, best wishes), "मातृ महिमा" (Matri Mahima), "गणेश चालिसा" (Ganesh Chalisa), "हनुमान भजन" (Hanuman Bhajan) are recorded.

Publications 

Atreya has edited books  and has published articles and poems on various topics in national and international journals/newspapers.

Awards 

	Mahendra Vidhyabhushana  "Kha" , Narayanhiti Royal Palace, Kathmandu, Nepal - 1973
	Kavi Bharati Samabhinandanam - Kavi Bharati Parishad, Banaras Hindu University, Varanasi, India - 1982
	Mahendra Vidhyabhushana "Ka", Narayanhiti Royal Palace, Kathmandu, Nepal - 1992
	Samman -Mahakavi Devakota Jayanti, Lalitpur, Nepal - 1996
	Gaddi Aarohan Rajat Mahotshav Padak - Narayanhiti Royal Palace, Kathmandu, Nepal - 1996
	Sadaramabhinandanam - Devaghatta Vaidikadhyatmika Sewa Parishad, Kathmandu, Nepal - Sanskritvarsham 1999 - 2000
	Dhirgha Sewa Padak - Mahendra Sanskrit University, Dang, Nepal - 1999
	Avinandan - Kapilavastu Samaj Kathmandu, Kathmandu, Nepal -2000
	Bhawani Bhikshu Puraskar - Kapilavastu Sahitiyika Samaj, Kapilavastu, Nepal - 2000
	Virendra Aishwarya Seva Padak - Narayanhiti Royal Palace, Kathmandu, Nepal
	Rastriya Sanskrit Gaurav Samman - Kavi Ratna Krishna Prashad Ghimire Smriti Pratisthan, Kathmandu, Nepal - 2000
	Sanskrita Shree Samman - Vishwa Hindu Ekata Parishad, Kathmandu, Nepal - 2000
	Mahakavi Kalidash Award - Twenty Fourth International Astrological Conference, Kolkata, India - 2001
	Banga Janani Award - Twenty Fourth International Astrological Conference, Kolkata, India - 2001
	Jagatacharya Chandra Swami Award - Viswa Jyotish Vidhyapith, 2001
	Prabachan Praveen Samman - Pivata Bhagwatam Rasmalayam, Kathmandu, Nepal -2002
	Bharati Kharel Smaraka Vyakhyan Samman Ewam Puraskar - Bharati Kharel Pratisthan, Kathmandu, Nepal - 2003 
	Avhinandan - Aryal Sewa Samaj, Kathmandu, Nepal - 2003
	Samman - Lumbini Society of Music, Arts and Literature, Kathmandu, Nepal - 2004
	Pratibha Samman Puraskar - Shree Dadhiram Marasini Memorial Academy, Kathmandu, Nepal - 2008
	Rudra Prashad Rijal Sanskrit Vidwat Puraskar - Rudra Prashad Rijal Smriti Puraskar Kosh, Hetauda, Nepal - 2010
	Sanskrit Bani Bhusan Samman - 2012
	Jyotish Hari Prashad Ghimire 'Hari Abhinav Puraskar' - 2013
	Nepal Sanskritik Sangh 'Dilliraj Upetri Smriti Puraskar' - 2014
 The Jayatu Sankritam Award - 2017 
 Pradesh Ratna - 2019

See also
Nepali literature
Laxmi Prasad Devkota
Madhav Prasad Ghimire

References

Nepalese writers
Nepalese scholars
1944 births
2020 deaths
Sampurnanand Sanskrit Vishwavidyalaya alumni
Tribhuvan University alumni
Sanskrit writers
Hindu poets
People from Kapilvastu District
Deaths from cancer in Nepal
Deaths from gallbladder cancer
Khas people